James Peter Dvorak (born December 16, 1948, New York City) is an American jazz trumpeter.

Dvorak received his bachelor's degree from the Eastman School of Music in 1970 and then relocated to England, where he lived for several decades. In the early 1970s he worked with Keith Tippett for the first time; the pair worked together again in the 1980s and 1990s. He played with Brotherhood of Breath from 1970 to 1975  and with a group called Joy around the same time, and played with Louis Moholo in the middle of the decade. He led his own groups from 1977 to 1982, first Sum Sum (with Elton Dean, Alan Skidmore, and Nick Evans), then Dhyana. In the 1980s he worked with Dudu Pukwana, Brian Abrahams, Keith Tippett, Maggie Nicols, and Ruthie Smith. In 1989 he joined the group In Cahoots, playing with them through most of the 1990s, and also worked with The Dedication Orchestra and with Marcio Mattos and Ken Hyder. He was a member of Mujician, again alongside Tippett, from the late 1990s.

References
"Jim Dvorak". The New Grove Dictionary of Jazz. 2nd edition, ed. Barry Kernfeld.

American jazz trumpeters
American male trumpeters
American emigrants to England
Musicians from New York City
1948 births
Living people
In Cahoots members
Jazz musicians from New York (state)
21st-century trumpeters
21st-century American male musicians
American male jazz musicians
Brotherhood of Breath members